The Kate Mullany House was the home of Kate Mullany (1845–1906), an early female labor leader who started the all-women Collar Laundry Union in Troy, New York in February 1864.  It was one of the first women's unions that lasted longer than the resolution of a specific issue. It is located at 350 8th Street in Troy, just off NY 7 one empty lot east of the Collar City Bridge.

The house was declared a National Historic Landmark in 1998.  It is now a National Historic Site. The site also includes Mullany's grave. The New York State Senate honored the house and its most famous resident for Women's History Month in March 2007.  The house is also on the New York Women's Heritage Trail.

Designation as a National Historic Site
Then First Lady Hillary Clinton toured the house in 2000, and named it as a "treasure".  Senator Daniel P. Moynihan had introduced a bill to designate the home as a National Historic Site, but the bill languished in the United States Senate.

Senator Clinton took up the bill in January 2001 when Moynhian retired, and she advocated for the home.  There were hearings on the bill, and the Congressional Budget Office undertook an official budget analysis for the United States Congress. The bill was co-sponsored by Senator Clinton and Representative Mike McNulty, supported by organized labor, and was passed into law. It is an affiliated area of the National Park Service; it remains privately owned and operated but the NPS provides technical support.

References

External links

 
Places Where Women Made History: the Kate Mullany House, at National Park Service
Wiawaka web site page on Kate Mullany . Accessed January 24, 2008.

Houses on the National Register of Historic Places in New York (state)
National Historic Sites in New York (state)
National Historic Landmarks in New York (state)
Houses completed in 1869
Labor rights
National Register of Historic Places in Troy, New York
Historic districts on the National Register of Historic Places in New York (state)
1869 establishments in New York (state)
Houses in Troy, New York
History of women in New York (state)